Oskar Alexander Richard Büttner (28 September 1858 – 1927) was a German botanist and mineralogist who was involved in the exploration of the Congo Basin.

Life

Büttner was born in Brandenburg on 28 September 1858. 
He studied in Berlin, where he received his doctorate in 1883 with his dissertation Flora advena marchica.
He was a scientific participant in the German Congo Expedition of the African Society in Germany (1884–1886), which, under the direction of Eduard Schulze, was to serve the "exploration of the southern Congo Basin". 
It penetrated into areas unexplored from a European point of view.
In 1890 he wrote Reisen im Kongolande about his travels. In 1890–1891 he was in charge of a research station in Bismarckburg, Togo. 
The station had been founded in June 1888 by the explorer Ludwig Wolf and named after the German chancellor Otto von Bismarck.
At that time, the station consisted of nine adobe buildings arranged in a rectangle.
Büttner had a palisade fence built for fortification.

After his return to Berlin Büttner worked as a teacher. 
There he founded the first chair for African languages in Germany. 
He died unmarried on September 11, 1927 in Berlin-Karlshorst.

Legacy

Some species were described according to Büttner's evidence, and he himself described Xyris congensis. 
Aloe buettneri and the Togo mouse (Leimacomys buettneri) were named after him.
Büttner is commemorated in the scientific name of a species of African lizard, Trachylepis buettneri.

Publications

References

Sources

 

1858 births
1927 deaths
19th-century German botanists
German entomologists
Explorers of Africa
German explorers